Meyer Lansky is a mixtape by rapper Tony Yayo hosted by Superstar Jay and DJ Love Dinero . The mixtape features exclusive tracks from Tony Yayo with appearances by Danny Brown, Styles P, Yo Gotti, Waka Flocka Flame, Shawty Lo, Roscoe Dash, Curren$y, G-Unit boss 50 Cent and others. It was released for digital download on August 3, 2011 on datpiff.

Background
The mixtape contain single from Yayo Haters which was intended to promote Yayo second album.

Track list

2011 mixtape albums
Tony Yayo albums
Cultural depictions of Meyer Lansky